Gabriel "Gabe" Mantle (born October 25, 1975) is a Canadian drummer, mostly known as the drummer of the pop punk group Gob. He has also been a part of a Vancouver hardcore band Brand New Unit's assembly as well as the pop band, Bloody Chicletts and old school punk band, Death Sentence.

He also played drums on the .married album by Canadian band The Tom Glenne 5.5 and lent his voice to the Canadian animated television series Being Ian.

Gabe appears in EA Sports' NHL 2004 under the name "Gabe Metal".

References 

  interview with BNU drummer

1975 births
Living people
Musicians from Vancouver
Canadian male drummers
Gob (band) members
21st-century Canadian drummers
21st-century Canadian male musicians